Jefri Kurniawan (born in Malang, 18 March 1991) is an Indonesian professional footballer of Chinese Indonesians descent who plays as a winger for Liga 2 club Gresik United.

Club career

Persinga Ngawi
Jefri Kurniawan was named as the best player in the 2015 Merdeka Cup when playing for Persinga Ngawi. Jefri also played for
Persegres Gresik United in the 2015 Jendral Sudirman Cup.

Pusamania Borneo
Jefri made his debut with Pusamania Borneo in 2016 Indonesia Soccer Championship A against Bali United. He scored his first goal in the third matchday, playing against Persiba Balikpapan.

Persija Jakarta
He was signed for Persija Jakarta to play in Liga 1 in the 2017 season. Jefri made his league debut on 16 April 2017 in a match against Persiba Balikpapan at the Batakan Stadium, Balikpapan.

Borneo (loan)
He was signed for Borneo to play in the Liga 1 in the 2017 season, on loan from Persija Jakarta. Jefri made his league debut on 5 August 2017 in a match against Sriwijaya at the Segiri Stadium, Samarinda.

Arema (loan)
He was signed for Arema to play in the Liga 1 in the 2018 season, on loan from Persija Jakarta. Jefri made his league debut on 24 April 2018 in a match against Persipura Jayapura at the Kanjuruhan Stadium, Malang.

Badak Lampung
In 2019, Jefri signed a one-year contract with Indonesian Liga 1 club Badak Lampung. He made his league debut on 18 May 2019 in a match against TIRA-Persikabo at the Pakansari Stadium, Cibinong. On 27 July 2019, Jefri scored his first goal for Badak Lampung in the 82nd minute against Madura United.

PSS Sleman
He was signed for PSS Sleman to play in Liga 1 in the 2019 middle season. Jefri made his league debut on 24 September 2019 in a match against Arema. On 29 October 2019, Jefri scored his first goal for PSS in the 16th minute against Persebaya Surabaya at the Gelora Bung Tomo Stadium, Surabaya.

International career
He was called up to Indonesian national team for a friendly match against Vietnam on 9 October 2016.

Honours

Club 
PSS Sleman
 Menpora Cup third place: 2021

References

External links 
 

1991 births
Badak Lampung F.C. players
Arema F.C. players
PSS Sleman players
Sportspeople from Malang
Indonesian footballers
Indonesian people of Chinese descent
Indonesian sportspeople of Chinese descent
Borneo F.C. players
Association football midfielders
Living people